The Sijil Kemuliaan is a decoration instituted in 1962. It is typically awarded to Singaporean citizens, but in special circumstances may be awarded to non-citizens as an honorary award (i.e. the Honorary Certificate of Honour). 

The medal of the award bears the inscription "Kerana Jasa Untok Negara" which translates to "For Services to the State" in Malay. There are currently no living recipients of the award in Singapore.

Recipients of the honour are entitled to use the post-nominal letters SK.

History 
The Sijil Kemuliaan was instituted on 19 April 1962. The rules of the award were revised in July 1996.

Recipients 
As of 2022, there are only three recipients.
Lim Hak Tai - Founder of the Nanyang Academy of Fine Arts
Wong Peng Soon - Malayan/Singaporean badminton player
Zubir Said - Singaporean composer (including the national anthem of Singapore)

References

Civil awards and decorations of Singapore